Trevor Williams was an English professional footballer who played as a winger.

References

Footballers from Grimsby
English footballers
Association football wingers
Grimsby Rangers F.C. players
Grimsby Town F.C. players
Grimsby Rovers F.C. players
Hull City A.F.C. players
Grimsby Victoria F.C. players
English Football League players